Moșoaia is a commune in Argeș County, Muntenia, Romania. It is composed of seven villages: Bătrâni, Ciocănăi, Dealu Viilor, Hințești, Lăzărești, Moșoaia and Smeura.

References

Communes in Argeș County
Localities in Muntenia